Helicoverpa punctigera, the native budworm, Australian bollworm or Chloridea marmada, is a species of moth in the family Noctuidae. This species is native to Australia. H. punctigera are capable of long distance migration from their inland Australian habitat towards coastal regions and are an occasional migrant to New Zealand.

This species is a generalist, with larvae observed feeding on at least 100 plant species, and are considered a pest for tobacco, flax, peas, sunflower, cotton, maize, tomatoes and other crops. Outside of agricultural settings, primary host plants include some Australian native daisies, in particular flat billy buttons Leiocarpa brevicompta, annual yellow tops Senecio gregorii, and also the native legume Cullen cinereum.Helicoverpa punctigera is often compared to its cousin species H. armigera who unlike H. punctigera has developed resistance to certain insecticides and other genetically modified cotton crops. The two species can occasionally be confused with one another as they look similar. However, the two species can be differentiated by characteristic differences in their hindwings. H. punctigera is often confused with two other moth species of the family Noctuidae – the Armyworm Moth (Mythimna unipuncta) and the Looper Moth  due to the medium sized nature of the three species.

Taxonomy 

Helicoverpa punctigera was first described in 1860 by Wallengren. The subject of classification has changed over the years. Originally classified into the Heliothis genus, this moth species was later re-classified into the Helicoverpa genus. The earliest record of H. punctigera in South Australia was in 1910 when it was referred to as “Grubby Tomatoes”.

Description

Eggs 

While its colours vary based on the stage of larval development. While originally white, the eggs will change to brown and finally black just before hatching.

Larvae 

Observed to be various shades of brown, green and orange, the larvae’s colour darkens as it matures and the dark spots on it become more apparent. The H. punctigera larva’s body is covered in small bumps, long stiff back hairs and bristles that cover its body and there are black hairs around the head.

Pupae 

Helicoverpa punctigera pupae range from dark brown to shiny brown in colour.

Adult 

While the male H. punctigera generally have dull green or yellow forewings, the female H. punctigera have brown or reddish-brown forewings. The adult H. punctigera strongly resembles the adult H. armigera except for its hindwing pattern: H. punctigera have a uniformly dark section in the hindwing, whereas H. armigera have a small pale patch here.

Life Cycle

Eggs 

H. punctigera eggs observe four stages in their development. The stages can be identified based on the colour of the egg. Freshly laid eggs are white and over time.  In warmer climates, the eggs take approximately three days to hatch, while in colder climates, they take between six to ten days to hatch.

Larvae 

H. punctigera larvae pass through six stages of growth before reaching the pupa stage. With a warmer temperature, they will reach the final stage within two to three weeks, while under colder temperature, they take about four to six weeks.

Pupae 

Prepupae larvae (larvae after the 6th growth stage) tunnel up to  under the soil to the base of the plant. The pupal chamber constructed will allow the H. punctigera to resurface when in adult stage. The pupal tunnels constructed are smoothed, well-packed soil with a thin layer of silk. The prepupae larvae avoid selecting soil locations where the temperature is higher than 38 degrees and have compacted soil.  The emergence of the adult is highly favoured by dry conditions. Rain and other external conditions that might collapse the tunnel reduces the survival rate of the adult H. punctigera due to the disruption of emergence.

The pupation process relies on the external temperature. In warmer temperatures, the pupation process takes approximately two weeks. While in colder temperatures, up to six weeks. During colder seasons, 70% to 90% of the pupae enter diapause. Pupae Diapause is the process in which the pupae development to the adult stage is suspended due to inhibiting or unfavourable environmental conditions.

Adult 
The adult Helicoverpa punctigera moth feeds on nectar after emerging from the pupae. Their adult lifespan is limited to ten days where they mate and lay their eggs before dying. The female typically lay their eggs either in clusters or singly on various developing fruit and flower buds. Each adult female lays approximately 1000 eggs during its lifecycle. Adult Helicoverpa punctigera moths typically live between two to four weeks. As they are nocturnal, they rest during the day and are active at night

Reproduction 
Belonging to the insecta class of animals, the H. punctigera follows an oviposition behaviour where it expulses its eggs by a vertebrate. Oviposition is the expulsion of eggs from the female insecta’s oviduct to an external environment. While the Oviposition behaviour is unrelated to the feeding habits of the female H. punctigera, the female H. punctigera tends to lay its eggs in areas with more flowering crops than in other areas. This is mainly due to the female H. punctigera feeding habits as the food chain is crucial in the reproductive cycle of the H. punctigera. Any factors affecting the food supply during their reproduction period (usually in summer) would determine the reproductive potential of the H. punctigera specials.  Despite the H. punctigera feeding habits however, the female H. punctigera is able to lay its eggs anywhere and at any time of day.

The selection of area is also crucial to the survival of the eggs and larvae of the H. punctigera. Selecting an area in the open will lead to the eggs and larvae being susceptible to various predatory insects and animals. Furthermore, selecting an area without sufficient food would mean that the larvae would not have enough to feed on as well.

Migration 
	
Helicoverpa punctigera is capable of long-range migration at high altitudes over host crops in addition to entire regions. With long distance flight being possible for the H. punctigera, their habitats are generally observed to be temporary once the H. punctigera reaches the adult stage of the life cycle. It is noted that the H. punctigera are found in abundance in the far inland and around the coast of Australia during the summer period. This is heavily due to the climate being favourable for the reproduction in summer.

 there was research regarding the migration of the H. punctigera, but it was difficult to test for the back-migration of H. punctigera. That was primarily due to there being a gradual migration of the population and there being no appropriate markers to track individual H. punctigera.  tracking had been greatly improved by advances in radar, population genetics markers, and dispersal modeling.

Ecology

Mutualism  

As a member of the Noctuidae family, H. punctigera plays a part in the pollination process of plants.

Food Guilds 

H. punctigera particularly feed on high value crops such as cotton, soybean, maize, and tomato and various other horticultural hosts.

In the early larvae stages, the H. punctigera feed on seeds and damage plant pods while in the mid to late stages of development, the larger H. punctigera larvae is able to consume entire plant pods and their contents.

Defence 
	
When disturbed, the H. punctigera lifts its head and curls it below the front of itself.  If disturbed further, it lets go of the leaf it resides on and drops while curling itself up into a spiral shape.

Economics

Agricultural Impact 
While in the larvae stage, H. punctigera cause farmers to lose millions of dollars’ worth of crops due to their polyphagous eating habits. They prefer eating mostly broadleaf species of plants such as cotton, chickpea and various native herbs in addition to a broad selection of other various pastures.The further the H. punctigera larvae is in the growth stage, the more the larvae consumes. When in the 5th and 6th instars, the H. punctigera larvae consumes 90% of the grain consumption the H. punctigera consumes in its life cycle.

When the H. punctigera consumes crops, chewing damage and holes can be observed on the plant pods and seed heads.

Pest Control Measures

Pheromone traps 
Various pest control measures have been implemented. Including the use of pheromone traps. Pheromone traps use synthetic pheromone lures (similar to the sex pheromones that females emit while mating) to lure the male punctigera into the trap. In addition to trapping the adult H. punctigera, pheromone traps are often used to monitor the activity of and predict the infestation rate of H. punctigera and other moths.

Genetically Modified Crops 

Unlike the closely related H. armigera, H. punctigera has not developed any resistance to majority of the chemical control measures created .Genetically modified Cotton plants such as the Bollgard II®   and the Bollarrd 3® are genetically modified plants that are used to deal with the H. punctigera larvae. These genetically modified plants produce their own Bacillus thuringiensis toxin that are toxic to the H. punctigera larvae.

Insecticides 

Research has shown that at the different instar (stages of development) stages of the H. punctigera, various insecticides have different levels of effectiveness with significant differences being observed through the various instar stages. (Source) Endosulfan used to be one of the components used in H. punctigera insecticides before its ban in 2011.  In addition to chemical pesticides, various Biopesticides have been created to manage H. punctigera in vegetation and field crops.  

A particularly effective biopesticide is nucleopolyhedrovirus (NPV) which is a disease that will attack the H. punctigera larvae. While larger doses and more time is required to kill the larvae at the later instar stages, the NPV biopesticide typically kills the larvae between 4 to 7 days. The climate in which this it is used impacts the time taken for NPV to be take effect. Where in cooler climates, it can take up to 10 days to kill the H. punctigera larvae.

Predators, Parasitoids and Pathogens 
	
Spiders and Predatory insects including various species of ants, predatory beetles, predatory bugs and lacewings often feed on the H. punctigera genus of moth.  While a proportion of the H. punctigera predators do not specifically prey on the H. punctigera, certain predators’ prey on specific life stages of the H. punctigera (e.g., larvae).

Various parasitoids attack the H. punctigera at various life stages. These parasitoids slowly kill their host by feeding off its nutrients effectively slowing the rate of larvae feeding resulting in lower rate of crop damage. Parasitoids that attack the H. punctigera include the Trichogramma and Ichneumon genera of wasps and Cacelia genus of flies.

Wasp Parasitoids spread ascovirus to larvae staged H. punctigera stunning their growth.  Other natural occurring diseases that kill the Helicoverpa larvae include fungal pathogens, Nuclear Polyhedrosis Virus (NPV) and Bacillus thuringiensis which creates proteins that are toxic to the larvae when consumed. Some genetically modified bacterial pathogens are used in commercial biopesticides. A popularly used pathogen is Bacillus thuringiensis (Bt) which mainly kills larval Lepidopterans when consumed. It is used in pesticides and when genetically modifying cotton plants.

References

External links

Native Budworm on OZanimals

punctigera
Agricultural pest insects
Endemic fauna of Australia
Moths of New Zealand
Moths of Australia